In geometry and crystallography, a Bravais lattice, named after , is an infinite array of discrete points generated by a set of discrete translation operations described in three dimensional space by

 

where the ni are any integers, and ai are primitive translation vectors, or primitive vectors, which lie in different directions (not necessarily mutually perpendicular) and span the lattice. The choice of primitive vectors for a given Bravais lattice is not unique. A fundamental aspect of any Bravais lattice is that, for any choice of direction, the lattice appears exactly the same from each of the discrete lattice points when looking in that chosen direction.

The Bravais lattice concept is used to formally define a crystalline arrangement and its (finite) frontiers. A crystal is made up of one or more atoms, called the basis or motif, at each lattice point. The basis may consist of atoms, molecules, or polymer strings of solid matter, and the lattice provides the locations of the basis. 

Two Bravais lattices are often considered equivalent if they have isomorphic symmetry groups. In this sense, there are 5 possible Bravais lattices in 2-dimensional space and 14 possible Bravais lattices in 3-dimensional space. The 14 possible symmetry groups of Bravais lattices are 14 of the 230 space groups. In the context of the space group classification, the Bravais lattices are also called Bravais classes, Bravais arithmetic classes, or Bravais flocks.

Unit cell

In crystallography, there is the concept of a unit cell which comprises the space between adjacent lattice points as well as any atoms in that space. (I.e., a lattice space is a multiple of a unit cell.) There are mainly two types of unit cells: primitive unit cells and conventional unit cells. A primitive cell is the very smallest component of a lattice (or crystal) which, when stacked together with lattice translation operations, reproduces the whole lattice (or crystal). Note that the translations must be lattice translation operations that cause the lattice to appear unchanged after the translation. If arbitrary translations were allowed, one could make a primitive cell half the size of the true one, and translate twice as often, as an example. Another way of defining the size of a primitive cell that avoids invoking lattice translation operations, is to say that the primitive cell is the smallest possible component of a lattice (or crystal) that can be repeated to reproduce the whole lattice (or crystal), and that contains exactly one lattice point. In either definition, the primitive cell is characterized by its small size. There are clearly many choices of cell that can reproduce the whole lattice when stacked (two lattice halves, for instance), and the minimum size requirement distinguishes the primitive cell from all these other valid repeating units. If the lattice or crystal is 2-dimensional, the primitive cell has a minimum area; likewise in 3 dimensions the primitive cell has a minimum volume. Despite this rigid minimum-size requirement, there is not one unique choice of primitive unit cell. In fact, all cells whose borders are primitive translation vectors will be primitive unit cells. The fact that there is not a unique choice of primitive translation vectors for a given lattice leads to the multiplicity of possible primitive unit cells. Conventional unit cells, on the other hand, are not necessarily minimum-size cells. They are chosen purely for convenience and are often used for illustration purposes. They are loosely defined.

Primitive unit cells are defined as unit cells with the smallest volume for a given crystal. (A crystal is a lattice and a basis at every lattice point.) To have the smallest cell volume, a primitive unit cell must contain (1) only one lattice point and (2) the minimum amount of basis constituents (e.g., the minimum number of atoms in a basis). For the former requirement, counting the number of lattice points in a unit cell is such that, if a lattice point is shared by m adjacent unit cells around that lattice point, then the point is counted as 1/m. The latter requirement is necessary since there are crystals that can be described by more than one combination of a lattice and a basis. For example, a crystal, viewed as a lattice with a single kind of atom located at every lattice point (the simplest basis form), may also be viewed as a lattice with a basis of two atoms. In this case, a primitive unit cell is a unit cell having only one lattice point in the first way of describing the crystal in order to ensure the smallest unit cell volume.

There can be more than one way to choose a primitive cell for a given crystal and each choice will have a different primitive cell shape, but the primitive cell volume is the same for every choice and each choice will have the property that a one-to-one correspondence can be established between primitive unit cells and discrete lattice points over the associated lattice. All primitive unit cells with different shapes for a given crystal have the same volume by definition; For a given crystal, if n is the density of lattice points in a lattice ensuring the minimum amount of basis constituents and v is the volume of a chosen primitive cell, then nv = 1 resulting in v = 1/n, so every primitive cell has the same volume of 1/n.

Among all possible primitive cells for a given crystal, an obvious primitive cell may be the parallelepiped formed by a chosen set of primitive translation vectors. (Again, these vectors must make a lattice with the minimum amount of basis constituents.) This primitive cell does not always show the clear symmetry of a given crystal. In this case, a conventional unit cell easily displaying the crystal symmetry is often used. The conventional unit cell volume will be an integer-multiple of the primitive unit cell volume.

Origin of concept 

Any lattice can be specified by the length of its two primitive translation vectors and the angle between them. There are an infinite number of possible lattices one can describe in this way. Some way to categorize different types of lattices is desired. One way to do so is to recognize that some lattices have inherent symmetry. One can impose conditions on the length of the primitive translation vectors and on the angle between them to produce various symmetric lattices. These symmetries themselves are categorized into different types, such as point groups (which includes mirror symmetries, inversion symmetries and rotation symmetries) and translational symmetries. Thus, lattices can be categorized based on what point group or translational symmetry applies to them.

In two dimensions, the most basic point group corresponds to rotational invariance under 2π and π, or 1- and 2-fold rotational symmetry. This actually applies automatically to all 2D lattices, and is the most general point group. Lattices contained in this group (technically all lattices, but conventionally all lattices that don't fall into any of the other point groups) are called oblique lattices. From there, there are 4 further combinations of point groups with translational elements (or equivalently, 4 types of restriction on the lengths/angles of the primitive translation vectors) that correspond to the 4 remaining lattice categories: square, hexagonal, rectangular, and centered rectangular. Thus altogether there are 5 Bravais lattices in 2 dimensions.

Likewise, in 3 dimensions, there are 14 Bravais lattices: 1 general "wastebasket" category (triclinic) and 13 more categories. These 14 lattice types are classified by their point groups into 7 lattice systems (triclinic, monoclinic, orthorhombic, tetragonal, cubic, trigonal, and hexagonal).

In 2 dimensions

In two-dimensional space there are 5 Bravais lattices, grouped into four lattice systems, shown in the table below. Below each diagram is the Pearson symbol for that Bravais lattice.

Note: In the unit cell diagrams in the following table the lattice points are depicted using black circles and the unit cells are depicted using parallelograms (which may be squares or rectangles) outlined in black. Although each of the four corners of each parallelogram connects to a lattice point, only one of the four lattice points technically belongs to a given unit cell and each of the other three lattice points belongs to one of the adjacent unit cells. This can be seen by imagining moving the unit cell parallelogram slightly left and slightly down while leaving all the black circles of the lattice points fixed.

The unit cells are specified according to the relative lengths of the cell edges (a and b) and the angle between them (θ). The area of the unit cell can be calculated by evaluating the norm , where a and b are the lattice vectors. The properties of the lattice systems are given below:

In 3 dimensions

In three-dimensional space there are 14 Bravais lattices. These are obtained by combining one of the seven lattice systems with one of the centering types. The centering types identify the locations of the lattice points in the unit cell as follows:

Primitive (P): lattice points on the cell corners only (sometimes called simple)
Base-centered (S: A, B, or C): lattice points on the cell corners with one additional point at the center of each face of one pair of parallel faces of the cell (sometimes called end-centered)
Body-centered (I): lattice points on the cell corners, with one additional point at the center of the cell
Face-centered (F): lattice points on the cell corners, with one additional point at the center of each of the faces of the cell

Not all combinations of lattice systems and centering types are needed to describe all of the possible lattices, as it can be shown that several of these are in fact equivalent to each other. For example, the monoclinic I lattice can be described by a monoclinic C lattice by different choice of crystal axes. Similarly, all A- or B-centred lattices can be described either by a C- or P-centering. This reduces the number of combinations to 14 conventional Bravais lattices, shown in the table below. Below each diagram is the Pearson symbol for that Bravais lattice.

Note: In the unit cell diagrams in the following table all the lattice points on the cell boundary (corners and faces) are shown; however, not all of these lattice points technically belong to the given unit cell.  This can be seen by imagining moving the unit cell slightly in the negative direction of each axis while keeping the lattice points fixed. Roughly speaking, this can be thought of as moving the unit cell slightly left, slightly down, and slightly out of the screen. This shows that only one of the eight corner lattice points (specifically the front, left, bottom one) belongs to the given unit cell (the other seven lattice points belong to adjacent unit cells). In addition, only one of the two lattice points shown on the top and bottom face in the Base-centered column belongs to the given unit cell. Finally, only three of the six lattice points on the faces in the Face-centered column belongs to the given unit cell.

The unit cells are specified according to six lattice parameters which are the relative lengths of the cell edges (a, b, c) and the angles between them (α, β, γ). The volume of the unit cell can be calculated by evaluating the triple product , where a, b, and c are the lattice vectors. The properties of the lattice systems are given below:

Some basic information for the lattice systems and Bravais lattices in three dimensions is summarized in the diagram at the beginning of this page. The seven sided polygon (heptagon) and the number 7 at the centre indicate the seven lattice systems. The inner heptagons indicate the lattice angles, lattice parameters, Bravais lattices and Schöenflies notations for the respective lattice systems.

In 4 dimensions

In four dimensions, there are 64 Bravais lattices. Of these, 23 are primitive and 41 are centered. Ten Bravais lattices split into enantiomorphic pairs.

See also

Crystal habit
Crystal system
Miller index
Reciprocal lattice
Translation operator (quantum mechanics)
Translational symmetry
Zone axis

References

Further reading
 (English: Memoir 1, Crystallographic Society of America, 1949.)

External links
Catalogue of Lattices (by Nebe and Sloane)

Crystallography
Tessellation
Lattice points

ja:ブラベー格子